Recoleta is a reservoir located  northeast of the city of Ovalle, in the Coquimbo Region, Chile.

References

Recoleta
Lakes of Coquimbo Region